Kim Sharma is an Indian actress and model who worked in the Bollywood industry. She made her acting debut in Yash Raj Film's 2000-romantic drama Mohabbatein where she played Sanjana.

Career
She then appeared in advertisements for multiple companies. Aditya Chopra signed her for his second directorial-venture titled Mohabbatein in 2000.

Filmography

Darr (1993) (extra)
Mohabbatein (2000) as Sanjana "Sanju" Chaturvedi (Debut Film)
Tum Se Achcha Kaun Hai (2002) as Bobby Gujral
Kehtaa Hai Dil Baar Baar (2002) as Ritu Patel
Khadgam (2002) as Pooja
Fida (2004) as Sonia
Padmashree Laloo Prasad Yadav (2005) as Rita
Yakeen (2005) as Tanya Thakur
Taj Mahal: An Eternal Love Story (2005) as Ladli Begum
Tom, Dick, and Harry (2006) as Bijli
Zindaggi Rocks (2006) as Joy
Kudiyon Ka Hai Zamana (2006) as Kanika
Nehlle Pe Dehlla (2007) as Kim (Pooja's friend)
Chhodon Naa Yaar (2007) as Rashmi
Godfather (2007), Pakistani Urdu movieMoney Hai Toh Honey Hai (2008) as SaraMagadheera (2009) in a special appearanceAnjaneyalu (2009) in an item number songYagam (2010) as Sophie

TelevisionCarry on Shekhar'' in Episode 30

References

External links

 
 

Living people
People from Ahmednagar
Actresses from Mumbai
Indian film actresses
Indian television actresses
Actresses in Hindi cinema
Actresses in Hindi television
Female models from Maharashtra
International Indian Film Academy Awards winners
Actresses in Urdu cinema
Indian expatriate actresses in Pakistan
20th-century Indian actresses
21st-century Indian actresses
Year of birth missing (living people)